Little Contentnea Creek is a  long 4th order tributary to Contentnea Creek in Pitt County, North Carolina.

Course
Little Contentnea Creek rises about 1 mile northeast of Saratoga, North Carolina and then flows south-southeast to join Contentnea Creek about 1.5 miles northeast of Fountain Hill.

Watershed
Little Contentnea Creek drains  of area, receives about 48.9 in/year of precipitation, has a wetness index of 592.44, and is about 17% forested.

References

Rivers of North Carolina
Rivers of Greene County, North Carolina
Rivers of Pitt County, North Carolina
Rivers of Wilson County, North Carolina